John Pedder (c1520- 1571) was an English churchman. A Marian exile, he was Dean of Worcester from 1559  until his death.

Pedder was educated at Peterhouse, Cambridge and was later elected a Fellow of Trinity College, Cambridge. He was Rector of Redgrave from 1551 to 1561; and then Vicar of Snitterfield, Warwickshire from 1563; and also Rector of Withington from 1568. He was appointed a Prebendary  of Norwich in 1557; and of Hereford in 1563.

References

Year of birth uncertain
1571 deaths
Deans of Worcester
Alumni of Peterhouse, Cambridge
Fellows of Trinity College, Cambridge